Jason Hobson (born 10 February 1983 in Swansea, Wales) is a former rugby union player who plays at prop

Club career
Hobson started his professional career at the Exeter Chiefs. He moved to Bristol Rugby in the summer of 2003.

On 9 June 2009, it was announced that he would be joining London Wasps on a 2-year deal ahead of the 2009–10 Guinness Premiership following Bristol's relegation from the Premiership. Hobson ruptured his Achilles and did not feature for Wasps during the 2009–10 campaign.

In February 2011, after Hobson's contract with Wasps was terminated, he signed for his old club Bristol for the remainder of the 2010-11 RFU Championship.

On 29 August 2014, Hobson announced his retirement from professional rugby with immediate effect.

International career
Hobson represented England at U21 level. He made his debut for the England Saxons side that defeated the Ireland Wolfhounds on 1 February 2008.

On 13 May, Hobson was called up to the Senior England Squad for the 2008 Summer tour of New Zealand. He made his international debut against New Zealand in Christchurch on 21 June 2008 where he came on for Matt Stevens.

References

External links
London Wasps profile
Bristol profile
England profile

1983 births
Living people
Rugby union players from Swansea
English rugby union players
Bristol Bears players
Wasps RFC players
England international rugby union players
Rugby union props
Exeter Chiefs players